The following are operators of the Sikorsky H-19 Chickasaw and Westland Whirlwind helicopters.

Sikorsky H-19 operators

Military

Argentina
Argentine Air Force
Argentine Navy

Belgium
Belgian Air Force

Cambodia
Khmer Royal Aviation (AVRK)

Canada
Royal Canadian Air Force
Royal Canadian Navy

Democratic Republic of the Congo
Congolaise Government

Chile
Chilean Air Force

Cuba

Revolutionary Armed Forces

Dominican Republic
Dominican Air Force

Denmark
Danish Air Force

France
French Air Force

Greece
Hellenic Air Force

Guatemala
Guatemalan Air Force

Haiti
Haitian Air Force

Honduras
Honduran Air Force

Israel
Israeli Air Force

Italy
Italian Air Force

Japan
Japan Air Self-Defense Force
Japan Ground Self-Defense Force
Japan Maritime Self-Defense Force

Katanga
Katangese Air Force

Kingdom of Laos
Royal Lao Air Force

Netherlands
Royal Netherlands Navy

Norway
Norwegian Navy

Pakistan
Pakistan Air Force
Pakistan Army

Philippines
Philippines Air Force

Portugal
Portuguese Air Force

South Vietnam
Republic of Vietnam Air Force

Spain
Spanish Air Force

Republic of China
Republic of China Air Force
Air Rescue Group

Thailand
Royal Thai Air Force

Turkey
Turkish Air Force

United Kingdom
Royal Navy

United States
United States Army
United States Air Force
United States Marine Corps
United States Navy
United States Coast Guard

Venezuela
Venezuelan Air Force

Historical

India
Indian Air Force

Civil

Belgium
Sabena

United States
New York Airways
Los Angeles Airways

Westland Whirlwind operators

Military

Austria
Austrian Air Force

Brazil
Brazilian Air Force
Brazilian Navy

Brunei
Brunei Air Force

France
French Navy

Ghana
Ghana Air Force

Iran
Imperial Iranian Air Force

Italy
Italian Air Force

Kuwait
Kuwait Air Force

Nigeria
Nigerian Air Force

Qatar
Qatar Air Force

United Kingdom
Royal Air Force

Royal Navy

Yugoslavia
SFR Yugoslav Air Force
783rd Helicopter Squadron

Civil

United Kingdom
 Bristow Helicopters
 British European Airways

See also 
 Sikorsky H-19 Chickasaw
 Westland Whirlwind

Notes

References 
 James, Derek M. Westland Aircraft since 1915. London: Putnam Aeronautical Books, 1991. .

External links

 Igor I. Sikorsky Historical Archives website - SIKORSKY PRODUCT HISTORY - S-55 (accessed 2018-05-27)

H-19